Red is the second album by British synth-pop duo the Communards, released on 5 October 1987 by London Records in the United Kingdom and MCA Records in the United States. It reached number 4 on the UK Albums Chart and number 93 on the US Billboard 200 and has been certified platinum in the UK. Red features the singles "Never Can Say Goodbye", "Tomorrow", "There's More to Love Than Boy Meets Girl" and "For a Friend".

Notable songs

"Never Can Say Goodbye"

The Clifton Davis-penned song was originally performed by the Jackson 5, but this rendition is similar to Gloria Gaynor's disco version. Jimmy Somerville's "straight ahead" vocals are a strength of the song, with Andy Kellman of AllMusic crediting him with producing a recording that "stands apart" from other versions. The single proved successful on both sides of the Atlantic; reaching number 4 in the UK and number 51 in the US, while being certified silver in the UK. The track was used in the Doctor Who episode "Father's Day".

"For a Friend"

The last cut on the original vinyl side one is an emotional ballad. It was written in memory of Mark Ashton, a friend of Somerville and Richard Coles who died of HIV/AIDS. Mark Hooper of The Rough Guide to Rock writes that this cut may be Somerville's "most impassioned moment". It was among the first pop songs to address AIDS. "For a Friend" reached number 28 on the British charts. It was featured in the soundtrack of the 2014 film Pride. It was also one of the songs played at Burberry’s February 2018 show, marking Christopher Bailey’s final outing for the brand.

Artwork and title
The album cover is white with a grey five-pointed star containing two faces in profile (the group's logo). Directly above the star is the band's name in plain all capital letters. Above the band's name in red flowing script is the album title 'Red'. The title is a nod to the duo's socialist leanings at the time. The US issue features the cover in red.

Reception

Opinions vary as to where this album stands next to its predecessor, Communards. Andy Kellman of AllMusic's retrospective review feels it "tops their respectable debut in nearly every aspect" and that the singles "Tomorrow" and "There's More to Love Than Boy Meets Girl" are "stronger than anything on the debut". On the other hand, Kate Walter of Spin said it is "weaker than [their] sizzling debut album". Balancing these opinions was Mark Hooper of The Rough Guide to Rock who wrote that the album is "every bit as accomplished as its predecessor".

Kellman's review praises the production work of Stephen Hague and calls the album "a defining Euro-dance record of the latter half of the '80s". Walter credits Cole's "rickety–tickety synthesizers" and "tingly keyboards" along with Somerville's "squeals" and "whoops" as strengths of the album but bemoans the lack of cohesion of the album's side two compared to its first half.

Track listing

Personnel

The Communards
 Jimmy Somerville – lead vocals and backing vocals
 Richard Coles – synthesizers, piano and drum machine

Additional musicians

 Rob Fisher – synthesizer and sequencer
 Dave Renwick – bass
 Gary Barnacle – soprano saxophone
 Simon Clarke – alto saxophone and baritone saxophone
 Pandit Dinesh – percussions
 Sally Herbert – violin
 Judd Lander – harmonica
 Roddy Lorimer – trumpet
 June Miles-Kingston – drums and backing vocals
 Audrey Riley – cello
 Jocelyn Pook – viola
 Tim Sanders – tenor saxophone
 Steve Sidwell – trumpet
 Anne Stephenson – violin
 Annie Whitehead – trombone
 Jo Pretzel – synthesizers
 Zita Wadwa – additional vocals
 Caroline Buckley – backing vocals

Charts

Weekly charts

Year-end charts

Certifications

References

1987 albums
Albums produced by Stephen Hague
The Communards albums
Eurodance albums
London Records albums
MCA Records albums